Guha is an Indian surname found mostly, albeit not uniquely, among Bengali Hindus. It is also another name for the Hindu deity Kartikeya .

Guhas mostly belong to Kayastha caste in Bengal. The Bengali Kayasthas evolved as a caste from a category of officials, between the 5th/6th century AD and 11th/12th century AD, its component elements being putative Kshatriyas and mostly Brahmins. Guhas (and Guhathakurtas) are considered as Kulin Kayasthas of Kashyapa gotra, along with Boses, Ghoshes and Mitras.

People with the name
 Anita Guha (1932–2007), Indian Bengali actress
 Anton-Andreas Guha (1937–2010), German journalist and author
 Biraja Sankar Guha (1894-1951), Indian physical anthropologist
 Buddhadeb Guha (born 1936), Indian Bengali writer
 Chinmoy Guha (born 1958), Indian author and academic
 Isa Guha (born 1985), English cricketer and commentator
 Jatindra Charan Guho (1892–1972), or Gobar Guha , Indian wrestler
 Phulrenu Guha (born 1911), Indian activist, educationist and politician
 Ramachandra Guha (born 1958), Indian historian
 Ranajit Guha (born 1923), Indian historian
 Subrata Guha (1946-2003), Indian cricketer
 Sujoy K. Guha (born 1940), Indian biomedical engineer

See also
Guhathakurta, a surname

References

Bengali Hindu surnames
Indian surnames
Kayastha